Boule et Bill (known in English as Billy & Buddy) is a popular comic, created in 1959 by Belgian writer-artist Jean Roba in collaboration with Maurice Rosy. In 2003, the artistic responsibility of the series was passed on to Roba's former assistant Laurent Verron. The stories center on a typical family: a man and his wife, their young son Boule and Bill the cocker spaniel.

History
Boule et Bill first appeared in the Belgian comics magazine Spirou on December 24, 1959. The ambition was to make a sort of European Peanuts. The debut was made in a so-called mini-récit (mini-story), a story in 32 very small pages, printed on the inner spread of the magazine. Roba had until then mainly made illustrations for the magazine and had helped some other authors (including André Franquin), and now started with his own series. A few months later, a four-page comic with the same heroes appeared, and shortly thereafter Roba created a weekly one page comic. For the next twenty-five years, Boule et Bill was one of the most popular series of the magazine, and appeared mostly on the back cover. Some of the strips were even published in the rival Le Journal de Mickey, which was based mainly around Walt Disney characters like Mickey Mouse and Donald Duck.
From 1961 to 1965, the strip appeared in British comic Valiant, renamed It's A Dog's Life. Boule's name was changed to Pete and Bill's was changed to Larry. Apart from those changes this strip was mostly the same.
21 Albums were edited by Dupuis until 1985, containing one long story and some 800 gags. Thereafter, Roba changed from editor, moving to Dargaud. In 2006, Jean Roba died, but he had announced that he wanted the series to be continued, and had appointed Verron as his successor.

Story
Boule et Bill relates the homely adventures of seven-year-old boy Boule and his dog Bill, a Cocker Spaniel, as well as that of Boule's mother and father and Caroline the turtle. Bill, while slightly anthropomorphized, basically acts as a normal dog, and the whole series places comical adventures in the realistic setting of a normal family in a normal town, with normal lives. Most of the gags happen in or around the house, but also include an almost yearly holiday setting with the family travelling away from home, usually at the beach.

Characters
 Boule is a young boy, always dressed  in a blue overalls and a yellow T-shirt. He is an ordinary boy who goes to school and has friends with whom he plays a lot.
 Bill is a Cocker Spaniel. He can't speak but resorts to many tricks to make himself understood. He can communicate with other animals, such as his best friend, Caroline. He is very resourceful and cunning to find food, likes sleeping on sofas but dislikes bathing. Some of the most recurring gags revolve around Boule and his dad tricking Bill into a bathtub for a reluctant wash. His long ears provide him with many abilities.
 Boule's mother stays at home and complies with domestic tasks. Her concerns are to keep the house clean and to prevent disasters from Boule and Bill's ideas.
 Boule's father tries to educate his son properly by taking advantage of his questions and blunders. However, he fails most of the time, even if he is quite proud of his personal knowledge. He works for an advertising company, likes gardening and sleeping on the sofa, which is also appreciated by Bill, which provides some recurring gags.
 Caroline is a green tortoise who belongs to Boule's family. She lives in the garden. When Bill first met her, he feared she could eat his bones, but was then reassured, for she eats only lettuce. Caroline is insomniac.
 Madame Stick is the neighbour of Boule's family. The widow of a colonel, she is very strict and severe. She is the owner of Corporal, a cat who is Bill's arch enemy.
 Gérard is a young snobbish boy and owns a dog similar to him. He tries to dwarf Boule and Bill but ends up being overcome by their inventiveness.
 Monsieur Coupon-Dubois is the boss of Boule's father. A very respectable man, Boule's father sometimes invites him to his home or is being trusted with precious objects, and finds it difficult to prevent Bill's blunders.
 Pouf is Boule's best friend, but is also a rival for Bill, who often teases him. He wears long hair which covers most of his head and a cap.
 Hildegarde is Pouf's cousin who lives in the country. She appeared a few times in the series.
 Boule's teacher

Original albums
Boule et Bill were first published by Dupuis, then from 1988 by Dargaud.

 Tel Boule, tel Bill
 Boule et Bill déboulent
 Les Copains d'abord
 Système Bill
 Bulle et Bill
 Tu te rappelles, Bill ?
 Bill ou Face
 Souvenirs de famille
 Le fauve est lâché
 Bill, chien modèle
 Bill de match
 Sieste sur ordonnance
 Papa, Maman, Boule et... moi
 Une vie de chien
 Attention chien marrant !
 Jeux de Bill

 Ce coquin cocker
 Carnet de Bill
 Ras le Bill
 Bill, nom d'un chien !
 Bill est maboul
 Globe-trotters
 Strip-Cocker
 Billets de Bill
 Les V'là !, 1999
 Faut rigoler !, 1999
 Bwouf allo Bill ?, 1999
 Les Quatre Saisons, 2001
 Quel cirque !, 2003
 La Bande à Bill, 2005
 Graine de cocker, 2007
 Mon meilleur ami, 2009

Other publications
 In 1999, the Boule et Bill series was entirely reedited by Dupuis, in albums of 48 strips, whereas the former albums were composed of either 64, 56 or 48 pages. This series consists of 24 albums published by Dupuis plus three albums originally published by Dargaud and reedited. The nine first albums of the original collection were replaced by 14 albums with different names. The other albums kept their original names, apart from the former 22nd album which was renamed Les v'la!. This new series went on after Roba's death with three new albums drawn by Verron:  Quel Cirque! (2003), La bande à Bill (2005), Graine de cocker (2007).
 In 1979 Une extraordinaire aventure de Boule et Bill: Bill a disparu ! was published in Spirou; written by André-Paul Duchateau, Bill goes missing and the various characters from Spirou magazine search for him.
 In 1987 L'album de famille de Boule et Bill was published by Dargaud.
 In 1997 Boule et Bill en famille was published.
 In 1999 Boule et Bill font la fête was published in commemoration of Boule et Bill's 40th anniversary.
 Four Best of Boule et Bill albums composed of previously published strips were published in 2003 and 2004: Plumes poils et compagnie, En vadrouille, Jeux d'hiver, and Home sweet home.
 A series of books for children was published in pocket format, illustrated by Roba and written by Fanny Joly, published by Mango as part of the Bibliomango line.
 An album, A l'école ... vite !, was published in 1999 by Atlas.
 Various special advertising albums were published.

English translations
Cinebook has been publishing the books in English, with Boule and Bill renamed Billy and Buddy, respectively.

 Remember this, Buddy? – Jun 2009 – 
 Bored Silly with Billy – Sep 2010 – 
 Friends First – Jun 2012 – 
 It's a Dog's Life - Sep 2013 - 
 Clowning Around - Jun 2014 - 
 Buddy's Gang - Oct 2016 - 
 Beware of (Funny) Dog! - Jul 2019 - 
 Fetch and Carry On - Aug 2022 -

Impact
Boule et Bill is among the best-selling French-language comics, with 300,000 copies for the new album by Verron in 2009.

Film adaptations

In 2013, a Belgian-French-Luxembourgian film was released, "Boule et Bill", based on the comics. It stars Franck Dubosc as the father, Marina Foïs as the mother, and Charles Crombez as Bill. It received bad reviews, but was commercially successful enough to warrant a sequel "Boule et Bill 2", released in 2017.

Television adaptations
Four animated television series based on Boule and Bill were produced:
Boule et Bill (1960 TV series) broadcast on RTF
Boule et Bill (1975 TV series) broadcast on TVA Dupuis
Boule et Bill (2000 TV series) broadcast on TF1
Boule et Bill (2004 TV series) broadcast on Unis (TV channel) with 104 episodes
Boule et Bill (2006 TV series) broadcast on TOU.TV with 104 episodes appears to be a re-dubbing of the 2004 series with the stories in a different order
Boule et Bill (2015 TV series) broadcast on France 3 and directed by Philippe Vidal. It includes two seasons comprising 26 10-minute episodes.

Video game adaptations

A Nintendo DS video game based on the comic was launched in 2008 by Atari and Anuman Interactive.

Tributes

In the Belgian Comic Strip Center in Brussels the permanent exhibition brings homage to the pioneers of Belgian comics, among them Jean Roba and his series Boule et Bill.

Boule et Bill is among the many Belgian comics characters to jokingly have a Brussels street named after them. The Rue au Beurre/ Boterstraat has a commemorative plaque with the name Rue Boule et Bill / Bollie en Billie straat placed under the actual street sign.

In 1992 a wall painting representing Boule and Bill was painted in the Rue du Chevreuil in Brussels. It was designed by G. Oregopoulos and D. Vandegeerde.

In 2000  a statue of Boule and Bill was erected in Jette, Belgium, next to where Roba lived. It was sculpted by Tom Frantzen. In 2014 the statue was subject of vandalism.

In 2002 La Poste, France's post office system, issued two postage stamps illustrating Boule and Bill. Three out of eight were semi-postal stamps benefiting the French Red Cross.

Sources

 Boule et Bill publications in Spirou  BDoubliées 
 Boule et Bill albums Bedetheque 

Footnotes

External links
 Toute la Para-BD Boule et Bill Non official site 
 On Dupuis website 
 Le site internet du dessinateur Laurent VERRON

Bandes dessinées
Belgian comic strips
Dupuis titles
Dargaud titles
Series of books
Belgian comics characters
1959 comics debuts
Comics about dogs
Comics characters introduced in 1959
Child characters in comics
Humor comics
Gag-a-day comics
Fictional dogs
Comic strip duos
Fictional Belgian people
Comics adapted into animated series
Comics adapted into television series
Belgian comics adapted into films
Comics adapted into video games